Elorza is a surname. Notable people with the surname include:

Cosme Damián de Churruca y Elorza (1761–1805), Basque Spanish noble, admiral and politician
Jorge Elorza (born 1976), American law professor and politician
Julián Elorza Aizpuru (1879-1964), Spanish politician
Pablo Elorza (born 1982), Argentine bass player, composer, arranger, author, producer and educator
Patricia Elorza (born 1984), Spanish handball player